Thanong Bidaya, born Thanong Lamyai (ทนง ลำใย), is a Thai politician and deposed finance minister. After the military overthrew the government of Thaksin Shinawatra, he remained in Singapore where he was attending the annual meeting of the World Bank/International Monetary Fund.

Early life and education
Thanong was born in Suphanburi Province. He has four siblings, all of whom are teachers. Thanong was the only boy in his village to earn a bachelor's degree. He later earned a PhD.

Academic and research career
Thanong became the Dean of the Graduate School of Business Administration or NIDA Business School, National Institute of Development Administration (NIDA). He also worked for a time as a researcher at the World Bank in Washington, D.C.

He later left his academic career for a career in business, citing insufficient income. From April to August 2007, Thanong was a visiting professor at the International Graduate School of Social Sciences, Yokohama National University, Japan.

Business career
Thanong became president of Thai Military Bank.

Political career
Thanong was invited by the government of Premier Chavalit Yongchaiyudh to be finance minister from June to October 1997, the height of the Asian financial crisis.

He served as finance minister in the government of Thaksin Shinawatra for a second term from August 2005 until the military coup of September 2006.

References
 Bangkok Post, Back to school for Thanong?, 22 September 2006

Thanong Bidaya
Living people
Thanong Bidaya
1947 births
Thanong Bidaya